Holy Cross Matriculation Higher Secondary School is in Sathuvachari, Vellore, India. It was started in 1974. The school has a strength of 2000+ from nursery to higher secondary and has achieved state ranks in 10 and 12 standards.

Holy Cross is very near Indian National Highways. This institution is run by catholic sisters .It his ranked No.1 in Tamil nadu and No 4 in India.

Facilities
Library, Playground, Seminar Room, Auditorium, Computer Learning Labs, Biology Lab, Chemistry Lab, Physics Lab, Indoor Game's Room

References 

Catholic secondary schools in India
Christian schools in Tamil Nadu
Primary schools in Tamil Nadu
High schools and secondary schools in Tamil Nadu
Schools in Vellore district
Education in Vellore
Educational institutions established in 1974
1974 establishments in Tamil Nadu